Ludwin  is a village in Łęczna County, Lublin Voivodeship, in eastern Poland. It is the seat of the gmina (administrative district) called Gmina Ludwin.

The area has a population of 5,041 includes several distinct colonies. It is recognized as an official part of Lublin Agglomeration, 
also as a gate to the Pojezierze Kameralne (Lakeland District).

References

Villages in Łęczna County
Lublin Governorate